Friedrich Frey-Herosé (12 October 1801, in Lindau – 22 September 1873) was a Swiss politician.

He was elected to the Swiss Federal Council on 16 November 1848 as one of the first seven members of the council. He was affiliated to the Free Democratic Party of Switzerland. 

During his office time he held the following departments:
 Department of Trade and Customs (1848 - 1853)
 Political Department (1854)
 Military Department (1855 - 1859)
 Political Department (1860)
 Department of Trade and Customs (1861 - 1866)
and was President of the Confederation twice in 1854 and 1860. 

He handed over office on 31 December 1866.

External links 

 
 

1801 births
1873 deaths
People from Lindau
Swiss Calvinist and Reformed Christians
Free Democratic Party of Switzerland politicians
Foreign ministers of Switzerland
Members of the Federal Council (Switzerland)
Aargau politicians